Polly Put the Kettle On is a 1917 American silent drama film directed by Douglas Gerrard and starring Gerrard, Thomas Jefferson and Ruth Clifford.

Cast
 Douglas Gerrard as Chester Creigg
 Thomas Jefferson Mr. Vance
 Ruth Clifford as Polly Vance
 Martha Mattox as Miss Johanna Webb
 Marvel Spencer as Myra Vance
 Lina Basquette as Nellie Vance
 Zoe Rae as Susie Vance

References

Bibliography
 Robert B. Connelly. The Silents: Silent Feature Films, 1910-36, Volume 40, Issue 2. December Press, 1998.

External links
 

1917 films
1917 drama films
1910s English-language films
American silent feature films
Silent American drama films
American black-and-white films
Universal Pictures films
Films directed by Douglas Gerrard
1910s American films